Idagunji is a small village in Honnavar Taluk, in the Uttara Kannada district of Karnataka state, India.

It is a famous place of Hindu pilgrimage and worship.

Geography 
Idugunji is close to Manki and about 14 km from Honnavar, in Honnavar Taluk; and 28 km from Navilgona.

Ganesha Temple

The Shree Vinayaka Devaru (Kannada:ಗಣಪತಿ ಇಡಗುಂಜಿ) is a Hindu temple dedicated to the god Ganesha (Vinayaka), located on the West Coast of India in the Idagunji town in Uttara Kannada district in Karnataka state, India. The temple's popularity as a religious place is recorded by about 1 million devotees visiting it annually.

It is one of the six famous Ganesha temples on the west Coast of India, which is also popularly called the "Ganesha Coast".

See also 
 Karwar
 Mangalore

External links 

Idagunji Temple Website
Karwar eNews

Hindu pilgrimage sites in India
Tourist attractions in Uttara Kannada district
Villages in Uttara Kannada district